Sybra binotata is a species of beetle in the family Cerambycidae. It was described by Gahan in 1907. It is known from Borneo, Sumatra, and the Philippines.

References

binotata
Beetles described in 1907